is a railway station in the city of Nikkō, Tochigi, Japan, operated by the private railway operator Tōbu Railway. The station is numbered "TN-51".

Lines

Station layout
The station consists of two opposed side platforms connected to the station building by a footbridge.

Platforms

Adjacent stations

History
It was renamed Daiyamukō in 1919. The station was closed in November 1927, and reopened on 1 March 1931. It was destaffed from 1 September 1983.

From 17 March 2012, station numbering was introduced on all Tōbu lines, with Daiyamukō Station becoming "TN-51.

The platforms received protection by the national government as a Registered Tangible Cultural Properties in 2017.

Passenger statistics
In fiscal 2019, the station was used by an average of 161 passengers daily (boarding passengers only).

Surrounding area
 Imaichi Daiyamukō Post Office

See also
 List of railway stations in Japan

References

External links

  

Railway stations in Tochigi Prefecture
Stations of Tobu Railway
Railway stations in Japan opened in 1917
Tobu Kinugawa Line
Nikkō, Tochigi
Registered Tangible Cultural Properties